
Lac de Champex is a lake in Valais, Switzerland. On the shores lies the village of Champex.

See also
List of mountain lakes of Switzerland

Champex